Cynthia Ann Parker (October 28, 1827 – March 1871), also known as Naduah (Comanche: Narua), was a white woman who was notable for having been captured during the Fort Parker massacre at about age nine, by a Comanche war band and adopted into the tribe. Twenty-four years later she was discovered and taken captive by Texas Rangers, at approximately age 33, and unwillingly taken back to European-American society. Her Comanche name means "someone found" in English.

Thoroughly assimilated as Comanche, Parker had married Peta Nocona, a chief. They had three children together, including son Quanah Parker, who became the last free Comanche chief.

Parker was captured by the Texas Rangers during the Battle of Pease River, also known as the "Pease River Massacre". During this raid, the Rangers killed an estimated six to twelve people, mostly women and children. Parker was taken against her will back to her extended biological family. For the remaining 10 years of her life, she mourned for her Comanche family, and refused to adjust to white society. She escaped at least once but was recaptured and brought back. Unable to grasp how thoroughly she identified with the Comanche, the European-American settlers believed that she had been saved or redeemed by being returned to their society. Heartbroken over her daughter's death from influenza and pneumonia, Parker died within years.

She died in 1871. Although initially buried in Anderson County, Texas, her remains were moved twice after her death. In 1910 her son Quanah had her moved to Post Oak Mission Cemetery, Comanche County, Oklahoma; and in 1957 the mother and son were both reinterred in Fort Sill Cemetery in Oklahoma. In 1965 the state of Texas arranged for her daughter's remains to be moved from Texas and reinterred next to the mother and son.

Early life 
Cynthia Ann Parker was born to Silas Mercer Parker and Lucinda Parker (née Duty) in Crawford County, Illinois. Her birth date is uncertain; according to the 1870 census of Anderson County, Texas, she was born in 1824 or 1825. Originally, her middle name was Ana, but over the years, it was changed to Ann. When she was nine or 10 years old, her grandfather, John Parker, was recruited to settle his family in north-central Texas; he was to establish a settlement fortified against Comanche raids, which had been devastating to the Euro-American colonization of Texas and northern Mexico. The Parker family, its extended kin, and surrounding families established fortified blockhouses and a central citadel—later named Fort Parker—on the headwaters of the Navasota River in what is now Limestone County.

Fort Parker massacre 

John Parker, the patriarch of the family, had been a noted ranger, scout, Native American fighter, and soldier for the United States. Historians conjecture that when he negotiated treaties with the local non-Comanche natives, he believed those treaties would bind all Native Americans. If so, his experience did not give him an understanding of the highly decentralized nature of Indian bands.

On May 19, 1836, a force of from 100 to 600 Native American warriors, composed of Comanche and Kiowa and Kichai allies, attacked the community. John Parker and his men did not comprehend the military prowess of the Comanche, and were unprepared for the ferocity and speed of the Indian warriors. They fought a rearguard action to protect some of the escaping women and children, but soon the settlers retreated into the fort. The Native Americans attacked the fort and quickly overpowered the outnumbered defenders. The Comanche took Cynthia Ann Parker, a young girl, and five other captives away into Comanche territory. The Texans quickly mounted a rescue force. During the Texans' pursuit of the Native Americans, a teenage girl escaped. Over a period of years, the Comanche released other captives as their families paid ransoms. But Parker was adopted by a Comanche family and became thoroughly assimilated. She is estimated to have been aged 9 or so when taken.

Marriage to Peta Nocona 

Parker became assimilated into the tribe. She was adopted by a Tenowish Comanche couple, who raised her as their own daughter. She became Comanche in every sense. She married Peta Nocona, a chief. They enjoyed a happy marriage. As a tribute to his great affection to her, he never took another wife, although it was traditional for chieftains to have several wives. They had three children: Quanah, who became the last free Comanche chief, a son Pecos (Pecan), and a daughter Topʉsana (Prairie Flower).

Return to Texas 

In December 1860, after years of searching at the behest of Parker's father and various scouts, a band of Texas Rangers led by Lawrence Sullivan Ross discovered a band of Comanche, deep in the heart of Comancheria, that was rumored to hold American captives. In a surprise raid, the Rangers attacked a group of Comanche in the Battle of Pease River.

After limited fighting, the Comanche attempted to flee. Ranger Ross and several of his men pursued the man who had appeared as the leader, and who was fleeing alongside a woman rider. As Ross and his men neared, she held a child over her head. The men did not shoot, but instead surrounded and stopped her. Ross continued to follow the chief, eventually shooting him three times. Although he fell off his horse, he was still alive and refused to surrender. Ross's cook, Antonio Martinez, identified the man as Nocona and killed him.

The Rangers began questioning the woman fleeing with Nocona and other surviving Comanche. In broken English, she identified herself and her family name. Her information matched what Ross knew of captives taken in the 1836 Fort Parker Massacre.

Ross sent Parker and her daughter to Camp Cooper, and notified her uncle, Colonel Isaac Parker that she had been returned. When Colonel Parker met her and said that his niece's name was Cynthia, she slapped her chest and said, "Me Cincee Ann." He took her to his home near Birdville.

Parker's return to her birth family captured the country's imagination. In 1861, the Texas legislature granted her a square league of land (about 4,400 acres or ) and an annual pension of $100 for the next five years. They appointed her cousins, Isaac Duke Parker and Benjamin F. Parker, as her legal guardians.

But Parker never adjusted to her new surroundings. Although white and physically part of the community, she was uncomfortable with the attention she received. Her brother, Silas Jr., was appointed her guardian in 1862, and took her to his home in Van Zandt County. When he entered the Confederate Army, she went to live with her sister, Orlena Parker O'Quinn. Some said that she missed her sons and worried about them.

Death 

In 1864, Parker's daughter, Topʉsana, caught influenza and died of pneumonia. Parker was stricken with grief, added to her missing her sons and life with the Comanche. She began refusing food and water. She died in March 1871 at the O'Quinn home and was buried in Foster Cemetery on County Road 478 in Anderson County near Poynor.

There is some confusion about Parker's birth and death dates. Different sources place her birth from 1825 to 1827 in Coles, Clark, or Crawford counties of Illinois, and her death from 1864 to 1871 in Anderson County. The only record of her death, given as March 1871, is found in the unpublished notebook of Susan Parker St. John. The only known document from the period supports the March 1871 date; an 1870 census for Anderson County lists her as a member of the O'Quinn household, born "abt 1825," age forty-five. Her tombstone marks her year of death as 1870.

In 1910, Parker's son, Quanah, moved her remains and had them reinterred in Post Oak Mission Cemetery near Cache, Oklahoma. When he died in February 1911, he was buried next to her.

Their bodies were moved in 1957 to the Fort Sill Post Cemetery at Fort Sill, Oklahoma. In 1965 the state of Texas had Prairie Flower's body moved from her grave in Edom, Van Zandt County, Texas, to be reinterred near her mother and brother.

Legacy
The city of Crowell, Texas, has held a Cynthia Ann Parker Festival to honor her memory. The town of Groesbeck holds an annual Christmas Festival at the site of old Fort Parker every December. It has been rebuilt on the original site to historic specifications.

Further reading
 Carlson, Paul H. (2012) Myth, Memory, and Massacre: The Pease River Capture of Cynthia Ann Parker.
 Frankel, Glenn (2003) The Searchers: The Making of an American Legend.

Representation in other media 
 Cynthia Parker is a one-act opera composed by Julia Smith.
 The novel The Searchers (1954) by Alan Le May is loosely based on Parker's life.
 The movie The Searchers (1956) was based on Le May's novel. It was directed by John Ford and starred John Wayne as a frontiersman searching for years for his kidnapped niece. Natalie Wood and her younger sister, Lana Wood, portray the captive woman at different ages.
 In The Hanging Tree (1957), a collection of short stories by Western writer Dorothy M. Johnson, the story "Lost Sister" is a fictional account of Parker's forced return to and difficulties in European-American society. 
 The graphic novel Comanche Moon (1979) by Jaxon depicts Parker's story from her adoption by the Comanche through the life of her son Quanah.
 Ride the Wind (1982) by Lucia St. Clair Robson is an historical novel of Parker's capture and life among the Comanche.
 Season of Yellow Leaf (1983) by Douglas C. Jones is a novel about a girl, Chosen, who is taken captive in the 1830s; it is loosely based on Parker's life.
 Gone the Dreams and Dancing (1984), also by Jones, is a novel loosely based on Quanah Parker, following a band of Comanche after they settle on a reservation. 
 The movie Dances with Wolves (1990) has a woman character, Stands with a Fist, loosely based on Parker, but she is adopted by Sioux.
 Where the Broken Heart Still Beats: The Story of Cynthia Ann Parker (1992) by Carolyn Meyer is a historical novel about Parker's life, written for middle grade children, age 9+.
 The Dutch writer Arthur Japin wrote De overgave (2007), a novel about the Parker family and the capture of Parker as a child.
 The novel Comanche Moon (1997) by Larry McMurtry refers briefly to Texas rangers "rescuing" Parker from an Indian camp.
 The miniseries Comanche Moon (2008), adapted from McMurtry's book, briefly notes Parker's capture from the Comanche and forced return to White society.

See also

List of solved missing person cases

Notes

References

Sources

Further reading

External links 
 Quanah Parker, informal biography, no author or sources

1827 births
1830s missing person cases
1870 deaths
Battles involving the Comanche
Captives of Native Americans
Comanche history
Formerly missing people
Native American history of Texas
People from Crawford County, Illinois
People from Limestone County, Texas
Texas–Indian Wars
Texas Ranger Division